Comostolopsis leuconeura is a moth of the family Geometridae first described by Louis Beethoven Prout in 1930. It is endemic to Réunion.

The wingspan is 15–22 mm.

The larvae feed on Flacourtiaceae (Aphloia theiformis).

See also
 List of moths of Réunion

References

Moths described in 1930
Boarmiini
Endemic fauna of Réunion
Moths of Réunion